Baltimore magazine is a monthly magazine published in Baltimore, Maryland by Rosebud Entertainment L.L.C., a company owned by Steve Geppi and led by its President Michael Teitelbaum. It is the oldest, continuously published city magazine in the continental U.S. and was first printed in 1907 by the Baltimore Chamber of Commerce. In 1977, Philip Merrill's Capital-Gazette Communications purchased Baltimore from the Chamber; Merrill sold the magazine to a group of investors in 1992. Steve Geppi acquired Baltimore in 1994. It is a member of the City and Regional Magazine Association (CRMA).

In addition to the monthly print publication, Baltimore magazine publishes daily content on www.baltimoremagazine.com and produces over 20 events per year. Every publication and event serves the company's mission of inspiring Baltimore to discover more, do more, and be more.

References

External links

1907 establishments in Maryland
Local interest magazines published in the United States
Magazines established in 1907
Magazines published in Baltimore
Monthly magazines published in the United States